The 2012–13 Biathlon World Cup – Mass start Men will start at December 16, 2012 in Pokljuka. Defending titlist is Andreas Birnbacher of Germany.

Competition format
In the mass start, all biathletes start at the same time and the first across the finish line wins. In this  competition, the distance is skied over five laps; there are four bouts of shooting (two prone, two standing, in that order) with the first shooting bout being at the lane corresponding to your bib (Bib #10 shoots at lane #10 regardless of position in race.) with rest of the shooting bouts being at the lane in the position they arrived (Arrive at the lane in fifth place, you shoot at lane five.). As in sprint races, competitors must ski one 150 m penalty loop for each miss. Here again, to avoid unwanted congestion, World Cup Mass starts are held with only the 30 top ranking athletes on the start line (half that of the Pursuit as here all contestants start simultaneously).

2011–12 Top 3 Standings

Medal winners

Standings

References

2012–13 Biathlon World Cup